Priziac is a commune in the Morbihan department of Brittany in north-western France.

Population
Inhabitants of Priziac are called in French Priziacois. The commune's population has been divided by three within a century because of rural exodus.

Geography

Historically, it belongs to Vannetais. Near the village centre is the Bel Air lake, with an area of 54 hectares. Apart from the village centre, there are about one hundred hamlets. Most of the hamlets consist in two or three houses but others are larger. In the past, the hamlet of Botquenven had more inhabitants than the village of Priziac.

Neighbouring communes

Priziac is border by Le Faouët and Langonnet to the west, by Plouray to he north, by Meslan to the south, Saint-Tugdual and Le Croisty to the east.

Map

History

Middle Ages

The fortified castle of La Roche Piriou stood on the top of a hill near the confluence of the river Ellé and the river Aër. It was besieged unsuccessfully by the troops of Walter of Mauny during the War of the Breton Succession

Guy Éder de La Fontenelle, a nobleman at the head of a band of 400 riders, seized the fortified castle of Cremenec, in Priziac, on february 10, 1595.

French Revolution

The first mayor of Priziac, Jean Le Roux, was murdered by a band of chouans in his house in the village of Kerveno, on decembre 23, 1794.

Galery

Chapels

Civil heritage

Landscapes

See also
Communes of the Morbihan department
Gaston-Auguste Schweitzer Sculptor of Priziac war memorial

References

External links

Official website 

 Mayors of Morbihan Association 

Communes of Morbihan